Chintalapudi is a village in Guntur district of the Indian state of Andhra Pradesh. It is located in Duggirala mandal of Tenali revenue division. The village forms a part of Andhra Pradesh Capital Region and is under the jurisdiction of APCRDA.

Geography 
Chintalapudi is situated to the northeast of the mandal headquarters, Duggirala,

Government and politics 

Chintalapudi gram panchayat is the local self-government of the village. It is divided into wards and each ward is represented by a ward member.

Education 
As per the school information report for the academic year 2018–19, the village has only one MPP.

See also 
List of villages in Guntur district

References 

Villages in Guntur district